Pterostichus oblongopunctatus is a species of ground beetle native to Europe.

References

Pterostichus
Beetles described in 1787
Beetles of Europe